"Dandini Dandini Dastana" or "Dandini" is a popular Turkish nursery rhyme.

Lyrics

See also
Turkish folk music

External links
 "UKTKlullabies", Lullabies-of-Europe.org.

Turkish-language songs
Turkish children's songs
Turkish folk songs
Turkish nursery rhymes
Traditional children's songs